Shekarabad (also Romanized as Shekarābād and Shokrābād) is a village in Yusefvand Rural District, in the Central District of Selseleh County, Lorestan Province, Iran. At the 2006 census, its population was 174, in 36 families.

References 

Towns and villages in Selseleh County